The English cricket team toured Zimbabwe for a two-match Test series and a three-match One Day International (ODI) series between 15 December 1996 and 3 January 1997. The Test series was drawn 0–0 and Zimbabwe won the ODI series 3–0. It was England's first senior tour of Zimbabwe.

Test series

1st Test

2nd Test

ODI series

1st ODI

2nd ODI

3rd ODI

See also 
 English cricket team in New Zealand in 1996–97 that followed weeks after this tour

References

External links
 England tour of Zimbabwe, 1996-97 at ESPNcricinfo

1996 in English cricket
1997 in English cricket
1996 in Zimbabwean cricket
1997 in Zimbabwean cricket
1996-97
International cricket competitions from 1994–95 to 1997
Zimbabwean cricket seasons from 1980–81 to 1999–2000